The 1904 West Virginia Mountaineers football team was an American football team that represented West Virginia University as an independent during the 1904 college football season. In its first season under head coach Anthony Chez, the team compiled a 6–3 record but was outscored by a total of 233 to 99. (The overall point totals were skewed by a 130–0 loss to Michigan.) Paul H. Martin was the team captain.

Schedule

References

West Virginia
West Virginia Mountaineers football seasons
West Virginia Mountaineers football